Nam Thanh may refer to several places in Vietnam, including:

 Nam Thanh, a ward of Điện Biên Phủ
 Nam Thanh, Nam Định, a commune of Nam Trực District
 Nam Thanh, Nghệ An, a commune of Nam Đàn District
 Nam Thanh, Thái Bình, a commune of Tiền Hải District
 Former Nam Thanh District of Hải Hưng Province

See also
 Nam Thành, Ninh Bình, a ward of Ninh Bình City
 Nam Thành, Nghệ An, a commune of Yên Thành District